Fairfield is a neighbourhood of Victoria, British Columbia. It is bounded by the James Bay, Downtown, Harris Green, Fernwood, Rockland, and Gonzales (Foul Bay) neighbourhoods, and meets the Strait of Juan de Fuca to the south.

Community
Fairfield is the southernmost neighbourhood in the city of Victoria, on southern Vancouver Island. It is Victoria's largest community by population and area, when considered together with the adjacent Gonzales neighbourhood.

Fairfield is a residential community with a mix of low-rise apartments and single family homes on well-maintained, tree-lined streets, such as Wellington Avenue. It is bounded to the east by Oak Bay, to the north by the community of Rockland, to the west by Beacon Hill Park and to the south by the ocean shoreline of the Strait of Juan de Fuca. Fairfield features the historic Ross Bay Cemetery, as well as many heritage buildings dating from the late Victorian and Edwardian periods.  The Fairfield Gonzalez Community Association (FGCA) serves "to enhance the quality of life in Fairfield by involving community members in identifying and acting on the needs of area residents".

The FGCA operates from and maintains the Fairfield Community Place, Fairfield's only neighbourhood centre. Its various committees help organize special events, recycling programs, beach cleanups, emergency preparedness programs, review and publicize planning and zoning changes, increase public awareness of community impacts from development, etc.

Significant population growth and demographic shifts are expected for southern Vancouver Island. The City of Victoria has prepared a neighbourhood profile from 2001 data.

History
Having founded the Hudson's Bay Company's (HBC) Fort Victoria in the 1850s, Sir James Douglas acquired for himself a large property between Fort Street and Clover Point, which he called Fairfield Farm. To the east lay the lands of Joseph Despard Pemberton (which stretched into what would become Oak Bay) and Isabelle Ross, BC's first female land owner (the location of Ross Bay Cemetery, land mistakenly thought to have been owned by her husband and HBC chief factor Charles Ross).

"Fairfield", at 601 Trutch Street, was built in 1861 by Joseph Trutch, who would later become the first Lieutenant Governor of British Columbia.  Although some houses in the western areas of Fairfield date from the 1880s, it was shortly after the turn of the century that much of the neighbourhood was developed, in a residential housing boom that ended in 1913.  It was in the early part of the twentieth century that the original Sir James Douglas Elementary School and the present Margaret Jenkins Elementary School were built to serve the community.

One of the oldest structures in central Fairfield is located at 1263 Richardson Street, a gothic gabled building from the 1860s (now strata-titled) that was moved down the hill from Rockland Avenue in the Rockland neighbourhood to make way for a much grander residence that today stands beside the Langham Court theatre.

Landmarks and Parkland

City Parks in the Fairfield neighbourhood include:
Beacon Hill
Clover Point
Ross Bay Cemetery
Moss Rock (Fairfield Hill) Park
Robert Porter Park
Brooke Street Park
Eberts Street Park
Pioneer Square
as well as several other smaller parks, playgrounds and greenspaces.

The popular scenic destination Clover Point offers views south to Washington State's Olympic Mountains, east to the impressive snow clad Mount Baker—a dormant volcano—and west to the Sooke Hills of southwestern Vancouver Island. The ocean waters off of the Point and along the Dallas Road waterfront are very popular with wind surfing and para-sailing enthusiasts thanks to strong on-shore winds. Clover Point is also the site of one of Victoria's two sewage pumping station's and a possible location for a sewage treatment plant mandated for the city by the BC government in July 2006.

Landmarks and areas of special interest include:
YM-YWCA of Greater Victoria
Christ Church Cathedral and School
Mount St. Mary Hospital
Beacon Hill Montessori Pre-School
Fairfield United Church
Sir James Douglas Elementary School
Ross Bay Villa (a.k.a. The Winter House)

Fairfield is the site of popular commercial hubs, Cook Street Village, Five Corners and the Fairfield Plaza.

Cook Street Village, a commercial area characterized by sidewalk-flanking Horse Chestnut trees, low-height buildings and the absence of bisecting roads, is a popular shopping and social strip in Fairfield, with cafés, restaurants, small boutiques and grocery stores. Shops and services in the village include the locally renowned Pic-a-Flic video store, Moka House, Bubby's Kitchen and the Beagle Pub. In 2006, proposed developments within this part of Fairfield sparked concern and debate among local residents.

Another small neighbourhood centre, known as Five Corners, is located at the intersection of Moss Street and Fairfield Road, featuring Sir James Douglas Elementary School, Fairfield United Church, Fairfield Bicycles, a general store, fish and chips shop, veterinary clinic and other services. This location has historically been a hub of community activity since the community's earliest days.  The school yard of Sir James Douglas school is the site of the locally-famous Moss Street Market, which runs weekly from April until October.

The Fairfield Plaza, a compact strip mall, is another modest shopping area, situated near the Fairfield/Gonzales border. It is worth noting however, as having the first Thrifty Foods of the Thrifty Foods grocery store chain Thrifty Foods - Our Company / Locations / Victoria - Fairfield - 1590 Fairfield, as well as the Ross Bay Pub, the Ross Bay Health Centre, government liquor store, Home Hardware and other enterprises.

Across Fairfield Road from the western entrance to the Fairfield Plaza is Emily Carr’s grave, in the Ross Bay Cemetery.

References

Terry Reksten, "More English than the English":  A Very Social History of Victoria, 1986:  Victoria, Orca Book Publishers
Ken Roueche, "A FAIRFIELD HISTORY": The story of the many great Canadians who have called Fairfield home: the Father of British Columbia, the Hanging Judge and the Royal Family of Hockey, just to name a few. And, the events that shaped Fairfield including The Guns of Dallas Road, the 1909 real estate boom and the arrival of the streetcars. Trafford Publishing, 2005
Martin Segger and Douglas Franklin, Victoria:  A Primer for Regional History in Architecture''  Victoria:  1979:  Heritage Architectural Guides

External links
 
 City of Victoria Community Resources Inventory - Fairfield – Local businesses & resources

Neighbourhoods in Victoria, British Columbia